Cylydrorhinini is a weevil tribe in the subfamily Entiminae.

Genera 
Caneorhinus – Cylydrorhinus – Gastrocis – Geosomus – Machaerophrys – Telurus – †Dorotheus

References 

 Lacordaire, T. 1863: Histoire Naturelle des Insectes. Genera des Coléoptères ou exposé méthodique et critique de tous les genres proposés jusqu'ici dans cet ordre d'insectes. Vol.: 6. Roret. Paris: 637 pp.
 Oberprieler, R.G. 2010: A reclassification of the weevil subfamily Cyclominae (Coleoptera: Curculionidae). Zootaxa, 2515: 1–35

External links 

Entiminae
Beetle tribes